Navy Cross may refer to:

Navy Cross, the award granted by the United States Navy for valor starting in 1917.
Navy Cross (South Africa), the award granted by the South African Navy for valor between 1991 and 2003.
Navy Cross of Merit (Poland), the award granted by the Polish Navy for valor starting in 2007.